Bobingen station is a railway station in the municipality of Bobingen, in Bavaria, Germany. It is located at the junction of the Augsburg–Buchloe and Bobingen–Landsberg am Lech lines of Deutsche Bahn.

Services
 the following services stop at Bobingen:

References

External links
 
 Bobingen layout 
 

Railway stations in Bavaria
Buildings and structures in Augsburg (district)